Jayes is an English surname. Notable people with the surname include:

 Brian Jayes (1932–1978), English football player
 Laura Jayes (born 1983), Australian journalist and television presenter
 Thomas Jayes (1877–1913), English cricket player

English-language surnames